Sunny Sohal (born 10 November 1987) is an Indian-born American professional cricketer from Mohali, Punjab, India. A right-handed batsman and occasional leg spin bowler, Sohal made his first class debut for Punjab against Hyderabad at Mohali in December 2005. In 14 first class matches up to June 2009 he has scored 931 runs at 42.31 with three centuries and taken one wicket for nine runs. He has represented the India Under 19 side and, although less prolific in limited overs cricket, also played in the IPL for the Deccan Chargers team. and for Kings XI Punjab.

In January 2018, he was named in the United States squad for the 2017–18 Regional Super50 tournament in the West Indies. In August 2018, he was named in the United States' squad for the 2018–19 ICC World Twenty20 Americas Qualifier tournament in Morrisville, North Carolina. In October 2018, he was named in the United States' squads for the 2018–19 Regional Super50 tournament in the West Indies and for the 2018 ICC World Cricket League Division Three tournament in Oman. However, he was ruled out of the latter due to injury.

In June 2019, he was selected to play for the Winnipeg Hawks franchise team in the 2019 Global T20 Canada tournament.

He made his Twenty20 International (T20I) debut for the United States against Bermuda on 22 August 2019.

In July 2020, he was named in the St Kitts & Nevis Patriots squad for the 2020 Caribbean Premier League. In June 2021, he was selected to take part in the Minor League Cricket tournament in the United States following the players' draft.

References

References
 

1987 births
Living people
American cricketers
United States Twenty20 International cricketers
Indian Sikhs
Punjab, India cricketers
Punjab Kings cricketers
Royal Challengers Bangalore cricketers
North Zone cricketers
Deccan Chargers cricketers
India Red cricketers
Indian cricketers
Sportspeople from Mohali
Barbados Royals cricketers
Cricketers from Punjab, India
Indian emigrants to the United States
American sportspeople of Indian descent
American people of Punjabi descent